The 2020–21 season is Salford City's 81st season in their history and the second consecutive season in EFL League Two. Along with League Two, the club participated in the FA Cup, EFL Cup and EFL Trophy.

The season covers the period from 1 July 2020 to 30 June 2021.

Transfers

Transfers in

Loans in

Loans out

Transfers out

Pre-season

Competitions

EFL League Two

League table

Results summary

Results by matchday

Matches

The 2020–21 season fixtures were released on 21 August.

FA Cup

The draw for the first round was made on Monday 26, October. The second round draw was revealed on Monday, 9 November by Danny Cowley.

EFL Cup

The first round draw was made on 18 August, live on Sky Sports, by Paul Merson. The draw for both the second and third round were confirmed on September 6, live on Sky Sports by Phil Babb.

EFL Trophy

The regional group stage draw was confirmed on 18 August. The second round draw was made by Matt Murray on 20 November, at St Andrew’s.

References

Salford City
Salford City F.C. seasons